The Pirita Velodrome is a velodrome and football stadium in the Pirita district of Tallinn, Estonia.

It has 1602 seats.

References

External links

 

Football venues in Estonia
Velodromes in Estonia
Sports venues in Tallinn
Cycle racing in Estonia
1969 establishments in Estonia
Sports venues completed in 1969